Bratz (also known as Bratz: C.I.Y. Shoppe Webseries) is a stop-motion web series, based on a line of toy dolls of the same name. It is produced by MGA Entertainment, and premiered on the Bratz YouTube channel.

Background
In August 2015, a new stop-motion web series premiered on YouTube. MGAE confirmed there would be 10 episodes for the first season.

Characters 
Cloe (Angel) She is one of the five main Bratz, who appear in the majority of the doll lines. Blonde hair, blue eyes, light skin tone.
Jade (Kool Kat) is one of the five main Bratz, who appear in the majority of the doll lines. Light skin tone, black hair, brown and sometimes hazel/green eyes.
Yasmin (Pretty Princess) She is one of the five main Bratz, who appear in the majority of the doll lines. Beauty mark underneath her left eye, brown eyes, tan skin tone, brown hair.
Sasha (Bunny Boo) She is one of the five main Bratz, who appear in the majority of the doll lines. Green eyes, dark skin tone, dark brown hair.
Raya (Sun Rayz) Light blue eyes, tan skin tone, blonde hair. Introduced in July 2015 as the fifth main character.

Episodes

References

Bratz
American animated web series
2015 web series debuts
Television series by Stoopid Buddy Stoodios
American children's web series